Krakornica is a village in the municipality of Mavrovo and Rostuša, North Macedonia.

Demographics
In statistics gathered by Vasil Kanchov in 1900, the village of Krakornica was inhabited by 180 Orthodox Albanians and 180 Muslim Albanians. In 1905 in statistics gathered by Dimitar Mishev Brancoff, Krakornica was inhabited by 210 Albanians and had a Bulgarian school. Due to the Balkan Wars (1912-1913) and their aftermath, Muslim Albanians from Krakornica abandoned the village. According to the 2002 census, the village had a total of 15 inhabitants. Ethnic groups in the village include:

Macedonians 15

References

Villages in Mavrovo and Rostuša Municipality
Albanian communities in North Macedonia